Anthem is an album by Black Uhuru, released originally in 1983 and internationally in 1984. In 1985, the album won Black Uhuru the first Grammy Award for Best Reggae Recording. Anthem has been released in three editions, each with different track listings and mixes, as well as a box set.

History
Lyrically, Anthem retains the trenchancy of its predecessors, criticizing social injustice and economic materialism and extolling Rastafarian values such as Afrocentrism, social equality and ital diet.  Musically, it fuses roots reggae and dub with "synthetic", electropop instrumentation and effects, resulting in an "ambiance of pop-reggae futurism".

Legacy
Anthem won the Grammy Award for Best Reggae Recording in 1985, the first year the award existed.

The album was well-received, earning Black Uhuru the highest accolades and broadest audience of their career.  The traditionally non-reggae elements added in the remixes were polarizing.  Both Robert Christgau and Allmusic's John Gonsalves were dubious about the remixes; Christgau felt that the songs held up in spite of the added effects while Gonsalves did not.

The album's success led to tensions between Duckie Simpson and Michael Rose, resulting in Rose's departure from the group.  Rose has stated that the album "came before its time".

Releases
Anthem has been released in three editions: the original recording, the UK remix and the US remix; despite their names, both of the latter were marketed internationally.  All three editions were included in a limited-edition box set, The Complete Anthem Sessions, along with non-album and previously-unreleased tracks.

Originally produced by Sly and Robbie, the album was resequenced and remixed by record company Island Records, omitting gaps between songs and further emphasizing the electropop aspect, particularly on the US version.  The UK and US editions respectively omitted "Party Next Door" and the Sly and the Family Stone cover "Somebody's Watching You", substituting a cover of Steven Van Zandt's "Solidarity", a charting non-album single from late 1983.

Personnel

 Michael Rose – lead vocals
 Puma Jones – harmony vocals
 Duckie Simpson – harmony vocals
 Darryl Thomson – guitar
 Mikey Chung – rhythm guitar
 Robbie Shakespeare – bass
 Sly Dunbar – drums
 Franklyn "Bubbler" Waul, Radcliffe "Dougie" Bryan – keyboards
 Dean Fraser – saxophone
 Ronald "Nambo" Robinson – trombone
 David Madden, Junior "Chico" Chin – trumpet
 Bernie Worrell – clavinet on "Somebody's Watching You"
 Chris "Sky Juice" Burth – percussion on "Party Next Door"
 Sly and Robbie - producers (original and dub releases)
 Steven Stanley - mixing (original release)
 Black Uhuru, Steven Stanley and Paul "Groucho" Smykle - producers (UK and US remixes)
 Chris Blackwell - executive producer (UK and US remixes)
 Noel Hearne, Steven Stanley – engineers
 Lynn Goldsmith – photography

References

1984 albums
Albums produced by Sly and Robbie
Black Uhuru albums
Grammy Award for Best Reggae Album
Mango Records albums